The Pacific hagfish (Eptatretus stoutii) is a species of hagfish. It lives in the mesopelagic to abyssal Pacific ocean, near the ocean floor. It is a jawless fish and has a body plan that resembles early paleozoic fish. They are able to excrete prodigious amounts of slime in self-defense.

Description
The Pacific hagfish has a long, eel-like body, but is not closely related to eels. It is dark brown, gray or brownish red, often tinted with blue or purple. The belly is lighter and sometimes has larger white patches. It has no true fins, but there is a dorsal fin-fold. The head, as in all agnathans, does not have jaws, and the sucker-like mouth is always open. The Pacific hagfish confused the scientists at first because Linnaeus mistakenly classified the organism as an "intestinal worm".

Hagfish have loosely fitting, slimy skins, and are notorious for their slime-production capability. When disturbed, they ooze proteins from slime glands in the skin that respond to water by becoming a slimy outer coating, expanding into a huge mass of slime. This makes the fish very unsavory to predators, and can even be used to clog the gills of predatory fish. Pacific hagfish can create large amounts of slime in just minutes. The slime is notoriously difficult to remove from fishing gear and equipment, and has led to Pacific fishermen bestowing the nickname of 'slime eel' on the species.

Hagfish also possess the unique ability to tie their bodies into knots. This adaptation becomes useful when the fish needs to remove the suffocating nature of its own slime by pulling itself through a knot. The knots also provide aid in the process of ripping apart meat.

Distribution and habitat
The Pacific hagfish occurs in the Eastern North Pacific from Canada to Mexico. The species appears to be abundant within its range.

Diet

While Pacific hagfish likely take polychaete worms and other invertebrates from the sea floor, they are also known to enter dead, dying or inhibited large fish through the mouth or the anus, and feed on their viscera. 

The diet of other hagfish species includes shrimps, hermit crabs, cephalopods, brittlestars, bony fishes, sharks, birds and whale flesh, but specific information about the Pacific hagfish is lacking.

The Pacific hagfish's skin can absorb amino acids.

Reproduction
Hagfish fertilise their eggs externally after the female has laid them. Females will however try to stay in their burrows during this period to ensure the protection of their eggs.

Use by humans
There is a well-developed hagfish fishery on the US West Coast that mostly supplies the Asian leather-market. Hagfish-skin clothing, belts, or other accessories are advertised and sold as "yuppie leather" or "eel-skin".

References

External links

Myxinidae
Western North American coastal fauna
Fish described in 1878